Powers Allen Boothe (June 1, 1948 – May 14, 2017) was an American actor known for his commanding character actor roles on film and television. He received a Primetime Emmy Award and nominations for two Screen Actors Guild Awards.

He won a Primetime Emmy Award for Outstanding Lead Actor in a Limited Series or Movie for his portrayal of Jim Jones in Guyana Tragedy: The Story of Jim Jones (1980). He also played saloon owner Cy Tolliver on Deadwood from 2004 to 2006, President Noah Daniels on 24 in 2007, and Lamar Wyatt in Nashville from 2012 to 2014. He also appeared in the western limited series Hatfields & McCoys (2012).

He is also known for his performances as "Curly Bill" Brocius in the western Tombstone (1993) and Alexander Haig in historical drama Nixon (1995). Other notable film roles include Cruising (1980), Red Dawn (1984), Blue Sky (1994), Sudden Death (1995), Sin City (2005), and Sin City: A Dame to Kill For (2014). 

He portrayed Gideon Malick in the Marvel Cinematic Universe's The Avengers (2012), and in the ABC series Agents of S.H.I.E.L.D. from 2015 to 2016. He was also the voice of Gorilla Grodd in the DC Animated Universe shows Justice League and Justice League Unlimited.

Early life 
Boothe, the youngest of three boys, was born June 1, 1948, at home on a cotton farm in Snyder, Texas, to Merrill Vestal Boothe (1924–1985), a rancher, and his wife Emily (née Reeves) Boothe (1924–1999). His father named him after his best friend, who had been killed in the Second World War.

Boothe attended Snyder High School, where he played football and appeared in school plays. He was the first in his family to go beyond high school, graduating with a Bachelor of Arts degree from Southwest Texas State University in San Marcos, and earning a Master of Fine Arts degree in Drama from Southern Methodist University in University Park, Texas.

Career 
After graduating from Southwest Texas State University in San Marcos, Texas, Boothe joined the repertory company of the Oregon Shakespeare Festival, with roles in Henry IV, Part 2 (portraying Henry IV of England), Troilus and Cressida, and others. His New York stage debut was in the 1974 Lincoln Center production of Richard III. Five years later, his Broadway theater debut came in a starring role in the one-act play Lone Star, written by James McLure.

Boothe first came to national attention in 1980, playing Jim Jones in the CBS-TV movie Guyana Tragedy: The Story of Jim Jones. Boothe's portrayal of the crazed cult leader received critical acclaim. In Time story on the production, Boothe was praised: "There is one extraordinary performance. A young actor named Powers Boothe captures all the charisma and evil of 'Dad', Jim Jones." Boothe won the Emmy Award for his role, beating out veterans Henry Fonda and Jason Robards. As the Screen Actors Guild were on strike in the fall of 1980, he was the only actor to cross picket lines to attend the ceremonies and accept his award, saying at the time, "This may be either the bravest moment of my career or the dumbest."

Boothe portrayed Philip Marlowe in a TV series based on Raymond Chandler's short stories for HBO in the 1980s. He appeared in such films as Southern Comfort, A Breed Apart, Red Dawn, The Emerald Forest, Rapid Fire and Extreme Prejudice, as well as the HBO films Into the Homeland and By Dawn's Early Light. Additionally, he appeared in the 1990 CBS-TV film Family of Spies, in which he played traitor Navy Officer John Walker. Boothe portrayed Curly Bill Brocius in the hit 1993 Western Tombstone, the disloyal senior Army officer in Blue Sky (opposite Jessica Lange's Oscar-winning performance), and the sinister lead terrorist in Sudden Death. He was also part of the large ensemble casts for Oliver Stone's Nixon (as Chief of Staff Alexander Haig) and U Turn (as the town sheriff).

In 2001, he starred as Flavius Aëtius, the Roman general in charge of stopping the Hun invasion in the made-for-TV miniseries Attila. Boothe played a featured role as brothel-owner Cy Tolliver on the HBO series Deadwood, and the corrupt senator Ethan Roark in the motion picture Sin City (2005), as well as its sequel, Sin City: A Dame to Kill For (2014). He is the voice of one of the characters in the 2005 video game Area 51 and of Gorilla Grodd, the hyper-intelligent telepathic supervillain in Justice League and Justice League Unlimited. He voiced the villain, Kane, in the 2008 video game Turok.

He was a special guest star on 24, where he played Vice President Noah Daniels. He returned in the prequel to the seventh season, 24: Redemption. Just after taking the role as acting President, Boothe is seen exiting Air Force Two with F-15s in the background. Boothe played a downed F-15 pilot in Red Dawn. In March 2008, he narrated a television campaign ad for Senator John McCain's presidential campaign.

In 2012, Boothe appeared in Joss Whedon's The Avengers in a secretive role as a shadowy governmental superior to S.H.I.E.L.D. In 2015–16, he reprised the role, now named Gideon Malick, in ABC's Agents of S.H.I.E.L.D.

Boothe appeared in the 2012 miniseries Hatfields & McCoys as Judge Valentine "Wall" Hatfield. Boothe was also cast as Lamar Wyatt in the ABC musical drama series Nashville. Boothe also lent his voice to Hitman: Absolution, a 2012 video game developed by IO Interactive, voicing the character of Benjamin Travis.

Personal life 
Boothe married his college sweetheart Pam Cole in 1969 and they remained married until his death. They had two children, Parisse and Preston.

Death 
Boothe died in Los Angeles, on the morning of May 14, 2017, 18 days short of his 69th birthday, from the effects of pancreatic cancer.

His body was buried in Deadwood Cemetery in rural Deadwood, located in Panola County east of Carthage in east Texas.

Filmography

Film

Television

Theatre

Video games

Awards and nominations

References

External links 
 
 
 
 Biography from HBO
 Powers Boothe(Aveleyman)

1948 births
2017 deaths
American art collectors
American male film actors
American male stage actors
American male television actors
American male video game actors
American male voice actors
American people of English descent
California Republicans
Deaths from cancer in California
Deaths from pancreatic cancer
Male actors from Los Angeles
Male actors from Texas
Outstanding Performance by a Lead Actor in a Miniseries or Movie Primetime Emmy Award winners
People from Snyder, Texas
Snyder High School (Texas) alumni
Southern Methodist University alumni
Texas State University alumni
20th-century American male actors
21st-century American male actors